Geotrichum is a genus of fungi found worldwide in soil, water, air, and sewage, as well as in plants, cereals, and dairy products; it is also commonly found in normal human flora and is isolated from sputum and feces. It was first described in 1809 by Johann Heinrich Friedrich Link.

The genus Geotrichum includes over 100 species. Some are welcome and even considered desirable. For example, skilled cheesemakers create conditions favorable for the formation of a Geotrichum candidum rind on certain goat's milk and cow's milk cheeses, proudly declaring the rind to be the most flavorful part of such cheeses. Another example is the presence of some Geotrichum species in fermented poi.

The most clinically relevant species is Saprochaeta capitata, formerly known as Geotrichum capitatum, with most cases occurring in Europe.

Saprochaete clavata, formerly known as Geotrichum clavatum, is an uncommon infection that has been associated with sporadic outbreaks. Geotrichum candidum is closely related to Saprochaeta sp., rarely isolated but may cause invasive and disseminated disease with high mortality Yeast-like and mold-like strains have been identified.

The most important risk factor for invasive fungal infection related to Geotrichum is severe immunosuppression, especially in hematological malignancies as acute leukemia, associated with profound and prolonged neutropenia.

Fungemia is very common, often with deep organ involvement (lung, liver, spleen, and central nervous system) and also skin and mucous membranes lesions. There is no optimal treatment for Geotrichum infections but based on existing data guidelines recommend amphotericin B with or without co-administered flucytosine or with voriconazole showing good in vitro susceptibility.

Mortality associated with Geotrichum-related infections is high, ranging from 57% to 80%.

Increasing the knowledge on Geotrichum related invasive fungal infections may improve early diagnosis and adequate treatment of these severe infections.



History
The genus Geotrichum was described by Johann Heinrich Friedrich Link in 1809 to accommodate the species G. candidum found on decaying leaves. Since then, over 130 taxa have been described in the genus, and hundreds of synonyms have been generated. For example G. candidum was misclassified as the Oidium lactis in much early literature. Species of Geotrichum resemble the genera Trichosporon and Protendomycopsis; however, Geotrichum is of ascomycetous affiliation whereas the latter are members of the Basidiomycota. Species of Geotrichum are occasionally mistaken for fast growing members of the genus Dipodascus, which are characterized by irregularly branched, 10-14 μm wide hyphae and the production of single-spored asci. However, unlike Geotrichum, members of the genus Dipodascus lack dichotomous branching of the peripheral hyphae and their growth rates are generally less than 3 mm per day.

Species
Species in this genus include the following:

 Geotrichum amycelicum 
 Geotrichum armillariae 
 Geotrichum asteroides 
 Geotrichum beigelii 
 Geotrichum bipunctatum 
 Geotrichum bogolepoffii 
 Geotrichum bostonense 
 Geotrichum brasiliense 
 Geotrichum brocianum 
 Geotrichum brocqii 
 Geotrichum brocquii 
 Geotrichum bryndzae 
 Geotrichum byssinum 
 Geotrichum candidum Link 1809
 Geotrichum candidum var. citri-aurantii (Ferraris) Cif. & F. Cif. 1955
 Geotrichum caoi 
 Geotrichum capitatum 
 Geotrichum carabidarum 
 Geotrichum cerebrinum 
 Geotrichum cinereum 
 Geotrichum cinnamomeum 
 Geotrichum citri-aurantii 
 Geotrichum clavatum 
 Geotrichum coccophilum 
 Geotrichum coremiiforme 
 Geotrichum cuboideum 
 Geotrichum cucujoidarum 
 Geotrichum cutaneum 
 Geotrichum cyphellae 
 Geotrichum decipiens 
 Geotrichum dermatitidis 
 Geotrichum doliiforme 
 Geotrichum dombrayi 
 Geotrichum dulcitum 
 Geotrichum eriense 
 Geotrichum europaeum 
 Geotrichum famatum 
 Geotrichum fermentans 
 Geotrichum fici 
 Geotrichum flavobrunneum 
 Geotrichum flexuosum 
 Geotrichum fragrans 
 Geotrichum funiculosum 
 Geotrichum ghanense 
 Geotrichum giganteum 
 Geotrichum gigas 
 Geotrichum gracile 
 Geotrichum hirtum 
 Geotrichum histeridarum 
 Geotrichum immite 
 Geotrichum infestans 
 Geotrichum ingens 
 Geotrichum issavi 
 Geotrichum javanense 
 Geotrichum keratinophilum 
 Geotrichum kieta 
 Geotrichum klebahnii (Stautz) Morenz 1960
 Geotrichum linkii 
 Geotrichum loubieri 
 Geotrichum louisianoideum 
 Geotrichum ludwigii 
 Geotrichum ludwigii 
 Geotrichum lutescens 
 Geotrichum magnum 
 Geotrichum malti-juniperini 
 Geotrichum matalense 
 Geotrichum membranogenes 
 Geotrichum microsporum 
 Geotrichum muisa 
 Geotrichum multifermentans 
 Geotrichum muyaga 
 Geotrichum mycoderma 
 Geotrichum nobile 
 Geotrichum novakii 
 Geotrichum nyabisi 
 Geotrichum pararugosum 
 Geotrichum penicillatum 
 Geotrichum phurueaense 
 Geotrichum phurueaensis 
 Geotrichum proteolyticum 
 Geotrichum pseudoalbicans 
 Geotrichum pseudocandidum 
 Geotrichum pulmonale 
 Geotrichum pulmoneum 
 Geotrichum purpurascens 
 Geotrichum rabesalama 
 Geotrichum rectangulatum 
 Geotrichum redaelli 
 Geotrichum redaellii 
 Geotrichum restrictum 
 Geotrichum robustum 
 Geotrichum roseum 
 Geotrichum rotundatum 
 Geotrichum rugosum 
 Geotrichum sakuranei 
 Geotrichum scaettae 
 Geotrichum sericeum 
 Geotrichum siamense 
 Geotrichum siamensis 
 Geotrichum silvicola 
 Geotrichum sphaeroides 
 Geotrichum spheroides 
 Geotrichum suaveolens 
 Geotrichum suaveolens 
 Geotrichum suaveolens 
 Geotrichum subtile 
 Geotrichum sulfureum 
 Geotrichum terrestre 
 Geotrichum vanriji 
 Geotrichum vanrijiae 
 Geotrichum vanryiae 
 Geotrichum variabile 
 Geotrichum variabilis 
 Geotrichum versiforme 
 Geotrichum virulens 
 Geotrichum vulgare 
 Geotrichum vulgaris 
 Geotrichum zambettakesii 
 Geotrichum zingiberis-saccharati

References

Saccharomycetes
Fungal plant pathogens and diseases
Animal fungal diseases
Taxa named by Johann Heinrich Friedrich Link
Ascomycota genera